Batocera lamondi is a species of beetle in the family Cerambycidae. It was described by Rigout in 1987. It is known from the Solomon Islands.

References

Batocerini
Beetles described in 1987